Tiger Stadium, previously known as Navin Field and  Briggs Stadium, was a multi-purpose stadium located in the Corktown neighborhood of Detroit. The stadium was nicknamed "The Corner" for its location at the intersection of Michigan and Trumbull Avenues. It hosted the Detroit Tigers of Major League Baseball (MLB) from 1912 to 1999, as well as the Detroit Lions of the National Football League (NFL) from 1938 to 1974. Tiger Stadium was declared a State of Michigan Historic Site in 1975 and has been listed on the National Register of Historic Places since 1989. 

The last Tigers game at the stadium was held on September 27, 1999. In the decade after the Tigers vacated the stadium, several rejected redevelopment and preservation efforts finally gave way to demolition. The stadium's demolition was completed on September 21, 2009, though the stadium's actual playing field remains at the corner where the stadium stood. 

In 2018, the site was redeveloped for youth sports.

History

Origins
In 1895, Detroit Tigers owner George Vanderbeck had a new ballpark built at the corner of Michigan and Trumbull Avenues. That stadium was called Bennett Park and featured a wooden grandstand with a wooden peaked roof in the outfield. At the time, some places in the outfield were only marked off with rope.

In 1911, new Tigers owner Frank Navin ordered a new steel-and-concrete baseball park to be built on the same site that would seat 23,000 to accommodate the growing numbers of fans. Navin Field opened on April 20, 1912, the same day as the Boston Red Sox's Fenway Park. While constructed on the same site as Bennett Park, the diamond at Navin Field was rotated 90°, with home plate located in what had been left field at Bennett Park. Cleveland Naps player "Shoeless" Joe Jackson, later banned from baseball for life following the Black Sox Scandal, scored the first run at Navin Field. 

Over the years, expansion continued to accommodate more spectators. In 1935, following Navin's death, new owner Walter Briggs oversaw the expansion of Navin Field to a capacity of 36,000 by extending the upper deck to the foul poles and across right field. By 1938, the city had agreed to move Cherry Street, allowing the left-field seats to be double-decked, and the now-renamed Briggs Stadium had a capacity of 53,000. In 1961, new owner John Fetzer took control of the stadium and gave it its final and longest-lasting name: Tiger Stadium.
A fire gutted the press box on the evening of February 1, 1977. In 1977, the Tigers sold the stadium to the city of Detroit, which then leased it back to the Tigers. As part of this transfer, the green wooden seats were replaced with blue and orange plastic ones and the stadium's interior, which was green, was painted blue to match.

By the early 1990s, both the city and Tigers ownership wanted a new park, but many campaigned to save the old stadium. Plans to modify and maintain Tiger Stadium as the home of the Tigers, known as the Cochrane Plan, were supported by many in the community, but were never seriously considered by the city or the Tigers. Ground was broken for the new Comerica Park on October 29, 1997.

Features

Tiger Stadium had a 125-foot (38 m) tall flagpole in fair play, to the left of dead center field near the 440-foot (134 m) mark. The same flag pole was to be brought to Comerica Park, but this never happened. A new flagpole in the spirit of Tiger Stadium's pole was positioned in fair play at Comerica Park until the left field fence was moved in closer prior to the 2003 season. 

When the stadium closed, it was tied with Fenway Park as the oldest ballpark in Major League Baseball, the two parks having opened on the same date in 1912. Taking predecessor Bennett Park into account, Tiger Stadium was the oldest Major League Baseball site in use in 1999.

When the park was expanded in 1936, a second deck was added over the right field pavilion and bleachers. To fit as many seats as possible in the expansion, the second deck was extended over the fence by 10 feet (3 m). The overhang would occasionally turn some extremely high arced fly balls into home runs. Spotlights were added above the warning track to illuminate the area beneath the overhang. 

Like other older baseball stadiums such as Fenway Park and Wrigley Field, Tiger Stadium offered "obstructed view" seats, some of which were directly behind a steel support column; while others in the lower deck had sight lines obstructed by the low-hanging upper deck. By making it possible for the upper deck to stand directly above the lower deck, the support columns allowed the average fan to sit closer to the field than at any other ballpark.

For a time after it was constructed, the right field upper deck had a "315" marker at the foul pole (later painted over), with a "325" marker below it on the lower deck fence (which was retained). The Texas Rangers claimed that the design of the right field section was copied and used in the construction of what is now Choctaw Stadium, but in fact the upper deck did not actually extend over the right field fence, but was set back by several feet.

Due to then-owner Walter Briggs's dislike of night baseball, lights were not installed at the stadium until 1948. The first night game at the stadium was held on June 15, 1948. Among major league parks whose construction predated the advent of night games, only Wrigley Field went longer without lights (1988).

Tiger Stadium featured an upper and lower deck bleacher section that was separated from the rest of the stadium. Chain link and at one time, a barbed wire fence, separated the bleachers from the reserved sections and was the only section of seating not covered by at least part of the roof. The bleachers had their own entrance, concession stands and restrooms.

In 1999, its final season, only this ballpark and Bank One Ballpark had a dirt path that ran from the pitcher's mound to home plate. It originally had one before it was removed.

Professional football
Tiger Stadium was home of the Detroit Lions from 1938 to 1974. The stadium hosted two NFL Championship Games in 1953 and 1957. The football field ran mostly in the outfield from the right field line to left center field parallel with the third base line. The benches for both the Lions and their opponents were on the outfield side of the field. 

In the early 1970s, the city of Pontiac and its community leaders made a presentation to the Metropolitan Stadium Committee of a  site on the city's eastern boundary, north of M-59 and near the intersection with Interstate 75 (I-75). Initially, a dual stadium complex was planned that included a moving roof that was later scrapped due to high costs and the lack of a commitment from the Tigers. The Metropolitan Stadium Committee voted unanimously for the Pontiac site. In 1973, ground was broken for a stadium to exclusively house the Lions.

The Lions played their final game at Tiger Stadium on Thanksgiving Day, November 28, 1974 against the Denver Broncos.

Other events
In 1939, boxer Joe Louis defended his world heavyweight title with an eleventh-round knockout of Bob Pastor at the stadium.

On October 5, 1951, the University of Notre Dame played the University of Detroit at Briggs Stadium before a capacity crowd of 52,000. It was the first Notre Dame football game to be played at night. The Fighting Irish won, 40–6.

Northern Irish professional soccer club Glentoran F.C. called the stadium home in the late 1960s. The team played as the Detroit Cougars in the United Soccer Association.

Notable moments and facts

When Ty Cobb played at Navin Field, the area of dirt in front of home plate was kept wet by the groundstaff to slow down Cobb's bunts and cause opposing infielders to slip as they fielded them. The area was nicknamed "Cobb's Lake".

On July 18, 1921, Babe Ruth hit what is believed to be the longest verified home run in Major League Baseball history. The home run went to straightaway center field, clearing the stadium and landing into the street. On July 13, 1934 at the stadium, Ruth hit his 700th career home run off Tigers' pitcher Tommy Bridges. 

On May 2, 1939, ailing New York Yankees first baseman Lou Gehrig voluntarily benched himself at Briggs Stadium, ending his streak of consecutive games at 2,130. Due to the progression of the disease named after him, it was the final game of his career.

The stadium hosted the 1941, 1951 and 1971 MLB All-Star Games. All three games featured home runs. Ted Williams won the 1941 game with a walk-off three-run home run. The ball was also carrying well in the 1951 and 1971 games. Of the many home runs in those games, the most often replayed is Reggie Jackson's drive to right field that hit so high up in the light tower that the TV camera lost sight of it, until it dropped to the field below. Jackson dropped his bat and watched it sail, seemingly astonished of his own power.

Toward the end of the Lions' game against the Chicago Bears at the stadium on October 24, 1971, Lions wide receiver Chuck Hughes collapsed and later died of a heart attack, making Hughes the only NFL player to date who died during a game.

On April 7, 1986, Dwight Evans hit a home run on the first pitch of Opening Day. This was also the first game on MLB's schedule that season, giving Evans the record for the earliest home run to start a season in terms of at bats.

There were over 30 home runs hit onto the right field roof over the years. It was a relatively soft touch compared to left field, with a  foul line and with a roof that was in line with the front of the lower deck. In left field, it was  farther down the line, and the roof was set back some distance. Only four of the game's most powerful right-handed sluggers (Harmon Killebrew, Frank Howard, Cecil Fielder and Mark McGwire) reached the left field rooftop. In his career, Norm Cash hit four home runs over the Tiger Stadium roof in right field and is the all-time leader.

Tiger Stadium saw exactly 11,111 Major League home runs.

The final game

On September 27, 1999, the final Tigers game was held at Tiger Stadium; an 8–2 victory over the Kansas City Royals, capped by a late grand slam by Robert Fick, which hit the right field roof. It was the final Major League hit, home run, and RBI in Tiger Stadium's history. Following the game, an emotional ceremony with past and present Tigers greats was held to mark the occasion. The Tigers moved to the newly constructed Comerica Park for their 2000 season, leaving Tiger Stadium unused.

Final years
On July 24, 2001, the day Detroit celebrated its 300th birthday, a Great Lakes Summer Collegiate League game between the Motor City Marauders and the Lake Erie Monarchs was played at Tiger Stadium. It was an effort by a local sports management company to bring a Frontier League franchise to Detroit.

In February 2006, a tent on Tiger Stadium's field played host to Anheuser-Busch's Bud Bowl 2006. Among performers at the nightclub-style event was Snoop Dogg. Anheuser-Busch promoted the event as Tiger Stadium's Last Call.

In 2006, the feature-length documentary Stranded at the Corner: The Battle to Save Historic Tiger Stadium was released. Funded by local businessman and ardent stadium supporter Peter Comstock Riley, and directed by Gary Glaser, it earned solid reviews and won three Telly awards and two Emmy awards for the film's writer and co-producer, Richard Bak, a local journalist and the author of two books about the stadium. It was also shown at the inaugural National Baseball Hall of Fame Film Festival in November 2006.

Demolition

There were many proposals to redevelop the site. By 2006, however, demolition appeared inevitable when then-Detroit Mayor Kwame Kilpatrick announced the stadium would be razed. In June 2007, the Detroit Economic Growth Corporation approved a plan to demolish the stadium, which needed approval from Detroit City Council. In July 2007, Detroit City Council voted 5–4 in approval of the demolition. 

In October 2007, an online auction of the stadium's memorabilia was held by Schneider Industries, which drew $192,729. The city used the proceeds to defray the demolition costs. 

The Detroit Economic Growth Corporation awarded the demolition contract on April 22, 2008, with the speculation that demolition revenue would come from the sale of scrap metal. Demolition began on June 30, 2008. A week into demolition, it was announced that the field, foul poles, and flagpole would be preserved.

After a hiatus wherein various plans to preserve portions of the stadium were considered, demolition was completed on September 21, 2009.

Redevelopment
During the summer of 2010, a group calling itself "The Navin Field Grounds Crew" began maintaining the playing field and hosting vintage baseball, youth baseball, and softball games at the site. There was at one time also a sign on the enclosing fence labeling the site "Ernie Harwell Park". 

On December 16, 2014, a $33 million project by Larson Realty Group to redevelop the old Tiger Stadium site was approved by Detroit's Economic Development Corporation. Along Trumbull Avenue, 24 town homes were planned for sale. Detroit's Police Athletic League (PAL) headquarters would relocate to the site and maintain the field. PAL would build its new headquarters and related facilities on the western and northern edges of the site while preserving the historic playing field for youth sports, including high school and college baseball. Construction of the project began in June 2016.

In 2018, the Corner Ballpark opened at the site.

Films and television
The stadium was seen in the 1980 feature film Raging Bull where it was the site of two of Jake LaMotta's championship boxing matches.

It was depicted in Disney's award-winning Tiger Town, a 1983 made-for-television baseball film written and directed by Detroit native, Alan Shapiro, starring Roy Scheider, Sparky Anderson, Ernie Harwell and Mary Wilson. It was also seen in Renaissance Man and Hardball. 

In the summer of 2000, the HBO movie 61* was filmed at Tiger Stadium. The film dramatized the efforts of New York Yankees teammates Mickey Mantle and Roger Maris during the 1961 season to break fellow Yankee Babe Ruth's single-season home run record of 60. For the film, computer-generated visual effects were used to make Tiger Stadium resemble Yankee Stadium in 1961. Yankee Stadium is listed in the credits at the end of the film as being played by Tiger Stadium. 

During the last days in which part of Tiger Stadium was still standing, scenes for the film Kill the Irishman, which were used to depict Cleveland Stadium, were shot at the stadium. 

The pilot of the HBO series Hung featured the stadium's demolition in its opening scene.

In popular culture
 Artist Gene Mack, who drew a series of pictures of several figures and ballparks, mentioned a bone that Ty Cobb used to "bone" his bats as part of his care for them. The bone stayed in the clubhouse after he left the Tigers in 1926 and, indeed, after he retired in 1928.
 In the music video for rapper Eminem's song "Beautiful", Eminem can be seen walking through the stadium, showing the destruction of the stadium.
 The site was filmed for the Hung episode "Fat Off My Love or I'm the Allergen".

Seating capacity

Gallery

References

External links

 Aerial Views, Demolition of Tiger Stadium 2008 – 2009
 A documentary on the battle to save Tiger Stadium
 Tiger Stadium Demolition News & Videos
 1950 Sanborn map showing Briggs Stadium

American football venues in Michigan
Baseball venues in Michigan
Soccer venues in Michigan
Sports venues in Detroit
Sports venues completed in 1912
1912 establishments in Michigan
2009 disestablishments in Michigan
Sports venues demolished in 2009
Defunct college football venues
Defunct Major League Baseball venues
Defunct National Football League venues
Defunct soccer venues in the United States
Detroit Lions stadiums
Detroit Tigers stadiums
Detroit Titans football
History of Detroit
Jewel Box parks
National Register of Historic Places in Detroit
Demolished sports venues in Michigan
Demolished buildings and structures in Michigan
Demolished buildings and structures in Detroit
North American Soccer League (1968–1984) stadiums
Defunct American football venues in the United States
Defunct baseball venues in the United States
Event venues on the National Register of Historic Places in Michigan
Sports venues on the National Register of Historic Places